Jasmine Alexandria Sagginario, better known simply as Jasmine (born September 1, 1994),  is an American pop singer and songwriter. Jasmine is best known for winning Radio Disney's 2009 N.B.T. (Next Big Thing) competition. She was a featured artist for Trinity Broadcasting Network's iShine KNECT, providing the show's original theme song. To date, Jasmine has released one album under iShine Records and several standalone singles, including singles that have been featured on major compilation albums and soundtracks.

Personal background 

Jasmine was born into a family of mixed ethnic backgrounds, including people of Hispanic and Italian descent. Jasmine was born in Los Angeles, California, but she and her family moved to Nashville, Tennessee, when she was eight years old. Before she became a singer, Jasmine took up cheerleading, but due to a constant strain on her vocal cords from yelling and shouting, Jasmine decided to give up cheerleading to pursue a career in music. Jasmine became interested in music when she was twelve years old.

Professional background

Acting career 

Jasmine is starting to pursue her acting career and has been busy auditioning for roles in Los Angeles. She has recently caught the attention of the acting agent Mitchell Gossett (the agent of Miley Cyrus), who is now representing Jasmine as her agent. "Jasmine has the natural ability to deliver a concept, and pull you into what she is saying. I look forward to being a part of her future success in this industry." says Gossett.

Music career 

Jasmine was a featured artist on iShine KNECT, a Christian tween show on TBN. In fact, her debut album was released on iShine Records. Season 2 of IShine KNECT does not feature Jasmine.

In 2009, at the age of 15, Jasmine entered, placed, and won Radio Disney's N.B.T. (Next Big Thing) music contest. Jasmine released her debut single Make a Movie on the soundtrack for Starstruck (2010 film). After The Next Me, Jasmine debuted her second single, "Boy Crazy". It was featured on Radio Disney Jams, Vol. 12. Then, in November, she released "Knock Knock". A music video and official remix were also made for the song.

On January 5, 2012, Jasmine released her third single, "GYOB (Get Your Own Boyfriend)", under the label Jsound. Jasmine Sagginario has started a band with her little sister Talia, called 2XO. Tally was cast on Season 2 and Season 3 of The Rap Game. On July 19, 2017 2XO released their debut single "Summer Love". On December 6, 2017 2XO released their version of Sleigh Ride through SoundCloud.

Discography 

Solo albums
 The Next Me (Jasmine album) (May 5, 2009)

Soundtrack albums
 Starstruck Soundtrack (February 9, 2010)
 Radio Disney Jams, Vol. 12 (March 30, 2010)

Solo singles
 "Boy Crazy" (2010)
 "Knock Knock" (2010)
 "GYOB (Get Your Own Boyfriend)" (2012)
 "Make It Louder" (2012)

2XO albums
 TBA (TBA)

2XO singles
 "Summer Love" (featuring Ricky Garcia) (2017)
 "Sleigh Ride" (2017)
 "Blame It On You" (2019)

References

External links 
 2XO
 Jasmine Sagginario at IMDB
 Jasmine Sagginario on YouTube

1994 births
Living people
21st-century American women singers
American child singers
American women pop singers
American women singer-songwriters
American people of Italian descent
American performers of Christian music
Child pop musicians
Hispanic and Latino American musicians
People from Franklin, Tennessee
Singers from Los Angeles
Singing talent show winners
Singer-songwriters from Tennessee
21st-century American singers
Hispanic and Latino American women singers
Singer-songwriters from California